Red Thread Games is an independent Norwegian video game developer based in Oslo. Their first release was Dreamfall Chapters, the episodic sequel to Dreamfall: The Longest Journey, released in five episodes between 2014 and 2016.

The team consists of several veterans from the Norwegian game industry, primarily former employees of Funcom. The team has previously worked on The Longest Journey, Dreamfall, Age of Conan, The Secret World and other titles.

History 
Red Thread was founded in September 2012 by Ragnar Tørnquist, creator of The Longest Journey and Dreamfall sagas, and The Secret World and Anarchy Online universes.

On 1 November 2012, Tørnquist announced that the long-awaited sequel to Dreamfall was on its way from his new development studio after obtaining 1,000,000 NOK in development grants from the Norwegian Film Institute for the pre production of Dreamfall Chapters.

On 8 February 2013, a Kickstarter campaign was launched for Dreamfall Chapters which closed at USD$1,538,425, almost doubling their goal of $850,000.

On 29 May 2013, Red Thread Games was granted an additional 1,500,000 NOK (~$250,000) from the Norwegian Film Institute.

On 30 October 2013, RTG announced that they had begun working on a new game titled Draugen, a first-person survival horror set in the 1920s Norway. The development has been funded by the Norwegian Film Institute with a grant of 850,000 NOK (approx. $144,000).

On 29 May 2019, Draugen was released to the public, receiving "mixed or average reviews", according to Metacritic.

Games 
 Dreamfall Chapters (2014–2017)
 Draugen (2019)
 Dustborn (TBA)
 Svalbard (TBA)

References

External links 
 Red Thread Games website

Companies based in Oslo
Indie video game developers
Norwegian companies established in 2012
 
Video game companies established in 2012
Video game companies of Norway
Video game development companies